The Art of War: Five Years in Formula One is a graphic novel created by former Williams F1 CEO Adam Parr. It details from the 2006 to the 2012 Formula One season through the eyes of the Williams team.

References

Formula One mass media